Marja-Liisa Kirvesniemi (née Hämäläinen; born 10 September 1955) is a Finnish former cross-country skier.

Career
She was the big figure at the 1984 Olympics in Sarajevo, winning all three individual cross-country skiing events (5, 10 and 20 km), and a bronze medal for Finland in the relay. In the process, she became the most successful athlete at the 1984 Winter Olympics. At the 1988 Winter Olympics in Calgary, she won another relay bronze medal, and at the 1994 Winter Olympics in Lillehammer, she won two more bronze medals in the 5 and 30 km.

At the FIS Nordic World Ski Championships, Kirvesniemi won three golds in the 10 km (1989) and 4 × 5 km relay (1978, 1989), and five silvers in the 5 km (1985, 1991), 10 km (1985) and 15 km (1989, 1993). She also won the 20 km double pursuit at the 1989 Holmenkollen ski festival.

Kirvesniemi won the Holmenkollen medal in 1989. Her husband, Harri, would be awarded the Holmenkollen medal in 1998. They were the third husband-and-wife pair that won this prestigious honor. They are the only married couple to have both competed at six Olympics, and are among the only eight Finns to have done so - the others being Janne Ahonen (ski jumping), Raimo Helminen (ice hockey), Teemu Selänne (ice hockey), Kyra Kyrklund (dressage), Juha Hirvi (shooting), and Hannu Manninen (nordic combined).

Cross-country skiing results
All results are sourced from the International Ski Federation (FIS).

Olympic Games
 7 medals – (3 gold, 4 bronze)

World Championships
 8 medals – (3 gold, 5 silver)

World Cup

Season titles
 2 titles – (2 overall)

Season standings

Individual podiums
 11 victories 
 27 podiums

Team podiums

 1 victory
 8 podiums

Note:   Until the 1999 World Championships and the 1994 Olympics, World Championship and Olympic races were included in the World Cup scoring system.

See also
 List of athletes with the most appearances at Olympic Games

References

Holmenkollen medalists - click Holmenkollmedaljen for downloadable pdf file 
Holmenkollen winners since 1892 - click Vinnere for downloadable pdf file

External links

1955 births
Living people
People from Rautjärvi
Cross-country skiers at the 1976 Winter Olympics
Cross-country skiers at the 1980 Winter Olympics
Cross-country skiers at the 1984 Winter Olympics
Cross-country skiers at the 1988 Winter Olympics
Cross-country skiers at the 1992 Winter Olympics
Cross-country skiers at the 1994 Winter Olympics
Finnish female cross-country skiers
Holmenkollen medalists
Holmenkollen Ski Festival winners
Olympic gold medalists for Finland
Olympic bronze medalists for Finland
Olympic cross-country skiers of Finland
Olympic medalists in cross-country skiing
FIS Nordic World Ski Championships medalists in cross-country skiing
FIS Cross-Country World Cup champions
Medalists at the 1984 Winter Olympics
Medalists at the 1988 Winter Olympics
Medalists at the 1994 Winter Olympics
Sportspeople from South Karelia
20th-century Finnish women